Alice of Jerusalem (also Haalis, Halis, or Adelicia; c. 1110 – after 1151) was a Princess consort of Antioch by marriage to Bohemond II of Antioch. She engaged in a longlasting power struggle during the reign of her daughter Constance of Antioch.

Life
Alice was the second daughter of King Baldwin II of Jerusalem and Morphia of Melitene. She had three sisters. She was an aunt of Kings Baldwin III and Amalric I.  Of her other sisters, Hodierna married Raymond II of Tripoli, and Ioveta became abbess of the convent in Bethany.

Princess consort of Antioch
Baldwin II had become regent of Antioch after the defeat of the principality at the Battle of Ager Sanguinis in 1119. In 1126, the 18-year-old Bohemond, son of Bohemond I, the first prince of Antioch, arrived to claim his inheritance. Immediately after the principality was handed over to him, Bohemond was married to Alice; the marriage was likely part of the negotiations prior to Bohemond's arrival.

Power struggle with Baldwin
In 1130, Bohemond was killed in battle with the Danishmends, and Baldwin returned to Antioch to assume the regency, but Alice wanted the city for herself. She attempted to make an alliance with Zengi, the Seljuk atabeg of Mosul and Aleppo, offering to marry her daughter to a Muslim prince. The messenger sent by Alice to Zengi was captured on the way by Baldwin, and was tortured and executed. Alice refused to let Baldwin enter Antioch, but some of the Antiochene nobles opened the gates for Baldwin's representatives, Fulk, Count of Anjou (Alice's brother-in-law) and Joscelin I of Edessa. Alice at first fled to the citadel but finally flung herself on her father's mercy and they were reconciled. She was expelled from Antioch, but was allowed to keep for herself Latakia and Jabala, the cities which had been her dowry when she had married Bohemond. Baldwin left Antioch under the regency of Joscelin, ruling for Alice and Bohemond's young daughter Constance.

Power struggle with Fulk
Baldwin also died in 1131. Baldwin was succeeded in Jerusalem by his eldest daughter, Alice's sister Melisende and her husband Fulk. Joscelin, too, died soon afterwards, and Alice again attempted to take control of Antioch, not wishing her young daughter to inherit the principality. The Antiochene nobles appealed to Fulk for help, and Alice allied with the rulers of the other two northern Crusader states, Pons of Tripoli and Joscelin I's son Joscelin II. Pons would not allow Fulk to pass through the County of Tripoli, and Fulk was forced to travel to Antioch by sea. Both Pons and Joscelin probably feared that Fulk wanted to impose the suzerainty of Jerusalem over the northern states, although it was also rumoured that Alice had simply bribed them. Fulk and Pons fought a battle near Rugia, but peace was eventually made, and Fulk restored the regency in Antioch, placing the principality under the control of Reynald Masoier.

Marriage of Constance
Around 1135, Alice again attempted to take control of Antioch, negotiating with the Byzantine Empire for a husband for Constance; the future emperor Manuel Comnenus was a candidate. Some of the nobles of the principality, however, not wanting a Greek alliance, secretly summoned Raymond of Poitiers to marry Constance. The Patriarch, Ralph of Domfront, convinced Alice that Raymond was coming to marry her, but instead he himself performed the wedding of Raymond and the still-underage Constance.

Alice was humiliated and left Antioch, never to return. She died after 1151.

References

William of Tyre, A History of Deeds Done Beyond the Sea, Volume II. Trans. Emily Atwater Babcock and A. C. Krey. Columbia University Press, 1943.
Steven Runciman, A History of the Crusades, Volume II: The Kingdom of Jerusalem and the Frankish East, 1100-1187. Cambridge University Press, 1952.

12th-century women
12th-century births
12th-century deaths
Year of birth uncertain
Year of death unknown
Women of the Crusader states
People from Antioch
Princesses of Antioch
Princesses of Taranto
Regents of Antioch
Daughters of kings
Royalty of the Kingdom of Jerusalem